Rayan Khaled Al-Boqami is a Saudi Arabian footballer who plays as a midfielder for Radwa.

References

External links

Living people
Saudi Arabian footballers
1992 births
Al Nassr FC players
Najran SC players
Al-Tai FC players
Al-Wehda Club (Mecca) players
Wej SC players
Al-Nahda Club (Saudi Arabia) players
Al-Najma SC players
Al-Tadamon SC (Saudi Arabia) players
Al-Zulfi FC players
Al-Rawdhah Club players
Al-Nojoom FC players
Radwa Club players
Sportspeople from Riyadh
Saudi First Division League players
Saudi Professional League players
Saudi Second Division players
Saudi Fourth Division players
Saudi Third Division players
Association football midfielders